Urunani BBC is a Burundian basketball club based in Bujumbura. The team is the current champion of the Viva Basketball League (VBL). 

Since 1979, Urunani has won more than 15 titles of national champions of Burundi (some years the national championship was not held for several reasons).

The name Urunani means "being together, a strong and indestructible network". The club played in the Basketball Championship Amateurs de Bujumbura (ACBAB) for the first time in 1979. 

Urunani BBC has already won 3 international competitions organized by the FIBA Zone 5.
The club also played in the FIBA Africa Clubs Champions Cup in 2011, 2013 and 2014.

At mid-2021, Urunani reached an agreement with the ugandan club, City Oilers to bring back home Landry Ndikumana, and the rwandan club Tigers for Malick Ngenzahayo. 
It’s at the end of 2021 that Urunani have completed the signing of Guibert Nijimbere from Patriots.
Ahead of the VBL 2022, the team acquired 5 international players from Uganda (Peter Obleng), South-Sudan (Peter Cheng Maleck), DRC (Michael Bwanga), Kenya (Paul Ereng Ekiru) and Nigeria (Njoku Joseph Chibuzo). With its strengthened roster, Urunani(17 wins/1 loss) managed to become the Burundian Champions and claimed a spot in the 2023 BAL Qualifiers.
The team became the first-ever team from  Burundi to win a semi-professional league : the Viva Basketball League in his first edition.

One of the notable players of Urunani, Elvis Hakizimana aka Gafyisi, wore No 8 during 20 seasons.
On January 24, 2022, Gafyisi retired, and Urunani retired number 8 during an emotional pregame ceremony at «Terrain Département».
On 26 January , Urunani signed Elvis Hakizimana as their new assistant-coach.

Honours
Burundian Basketball Championship

 Burundi Champions (15): ?, ?, ?, 2012, 2013, 2014, 2016, 2022

Heroes Cup

 Winners (?): 2019, 2021, 2022

Burundian Super Cup

 Winners (?): 2020

ACBAB

 Champions (?): 2017

FIBA Africa Zone 5 Champions
Winners (3): 2011, 2013, 2014

In African competitions
FIBA Africa Clubs Champions Cup
2011 – Regular Season
2013 – Regular Season
2014 - Regular Season

Notable players

References

External links
Official website

Basketball teams in Burundi
Basketball teams established in 1979
1979 establishments in Burundi
Road to BAL teams